Mammea timorensis is a species of flowering plant in the Calophyllaceae family. It is found only in Indonesia.

References

timorensis
Flora of the Lesser Sunda Islands
Vulnerable plants
Taxonomy articles created by Polbot